Walter Delano Brück (30 November 1900 – 28 August 1968) was an Austrian ice hockey player. He competed in the men's tournament at the 1928 Winter Olympics.

References

External links
 

1900 births
1968 deaths
Austrian ice hockey players
Ice hockey players at the 1928 Winter Olympics
Olympic ice hockey players of Austria
20th-century Austrian people